The 2007–08 Seattle SuperSonics season was the 41st and final season of the Seattle SuperSonics in the National Basketball Association (NBA) and the franchise's final season of play in Seattle before relocating to Oklahoma City to play as the Thunder. With the hiring of new head coach P. J. Carlesimo as replacement of Bob Hill, who was fired at the end of the previous season, the SuperSonics finished in 15th and last place in the Western Conference with a franchise worst 20–62 record. Seattle's first round draft pick and number two overall Kevin Durant was chosen as the Rookie of the Year at the end of the season.

As of 2022, the only remaining Sonics in the NBA are Jeff Green of the Denver Nuggets and Kevin Durant of the Phoenix Suns, after Nick Collison retired in 2018. Collison was also the last remaining player on the Thunder roster who previously played for the Sonics team, with Russell Westbrook and Serge Ibaka being drafted under the SuperSonics name in 2008 before moving to Oklahoma City. Until 2019, Mark Bryant was also the last Sonics coach to remain with the franchise on the Thunder roster. General manager Sam Presti is currently the last remaining Sonics staff member to remain with the franchise on the Thunder roster as of 2020.

Offseason
Following Bob Hill and Rick Sund's departures as head coach and general manager respectively, President of Basketball Operations Lenny Wilkens was charged with the responsibility of finding replacements. For the general manager position, Wilkens hired Sam Presti and months later P. J. Carlesimo was appointed as head coach of the Sonics. Wilkens quit a day later.
Presti's first order of business involved a trade with the Boston Celtics on draft day that sent Ray Allen and the SuperSonics' second round pick Glen Davis to Boston in exchange for the Celtics' first round pick Jeff Green, Wally Szczerbiak and Delonte West. Weeks later the free agent period began, and the SuperSonics' front office needed to reach a decision regarding Rashard Lewis' future, since Lewis opted out of his final two years and became one of the most prized free agents in the offseason. The team finally agreed to a sign and trade deal with the Orlando Magic. The other trade the Sonics made during the offseason brought 12-year veteran Kurt Thomas from the Phoenix Suns.

The SuperSonics began preparations for the regular season on July 7, kicking off Summer League games in Las Vegas. The team finished with a 2–6 overall record, with rookies Kevin Durant and Jeff Green leading the team in scoring in the majority of the matches.

Draft picks
At the 2007 Draft Lottery the SuperSonics got the second overall pick behind the Portland Trail Blazers, matching their highest overall selection in franchise history. With their first round pick the SuperSonics selected Kevin Durant from Texas and forwards Carl Landry and Glen Davis in the second round. Davis and Landry were traded on draft day to the Boston Celtics and the Houston Rockets respectively.

Pre-season
The SuperSonics kicked off a ten-game pre-season on October 9, with a 98–104 loss visiting the Sacramento Kings. Following a victory against the Cleveland Cavaliers in their next match three days later, the SuperSonics went on a 5-game losing streak before closing the exhibition tour with a victory against the Phoenix Suns in Vancouver, Canada.

Game log

|- style="background:#fcc;"
| 1
| October 9
| @ Sacramento
| 
| Damien Wilkins (18)
| Nick Collison (9)
| Delonte West (6)
| ARCO Arena13,284
| 0–1
|- style="background:#cfc;"
| 2
| October 12
| @ Cleveland
| 
| Chris Wilcox (20)
| Nick Collison (11)
| Earl Watson (6)
| Quicken Loans Arena15,878
| 1–1
|- style="background:#fcc;"
| 3
| October 13
| @ Indiana
| 
| Kevin Durant (21)
| Mouhamed Sene (15)
| Four players (4)
| Conseco Fieldhouse10,796
| 1–2
|- style="background:#fcc;"
| 4
| October 18
| @ L. A. Lakers
| 
| Kevin Durant (19)
| Robert Swift (8)
| Luke Ridnour (8)
| Bakersfield, California6,016
| 1–3
|- style="background:#fcc;"
| 5
| October 20
| Houston
| 
| Kevin Durant (25)
| Kurt Thomas (12)
| Delonte West (7)
| KeyArena10,854
| 1–4
|- style="background:#fcc;"
| 6
| October 23
| Golden State
| 
| Damien Wilkins (27)
| Chris Wilcox (12)
| Earl Watson (14)
| KeyArena9,861
| 1–5
|- style="background:#fcc;"
| 7
| October 24
| @ Portland
| 
| Nick Collison (17)
| Chris Wilcox (7)
| Luke Ridnour (8)
| Rose Garden11,342
| 1–6
|- style="background:#cfc;"
| 8
| October 26
| Phoenix
| 
| Chris Wilcox (27)
| Nick Collison (11)
| Delonte West (9)
| General Motors Place17,704
| 2–6

Roster

Regular season
Kevin Durant and Jeff Green's regular season debuts were in doubt, since each player had to deal with sprained ankle injuries during the pre-season. Durant managed to return in time for the season opener on Halloween night, scoring 18 points in a loss against the Denver Nuggets. After their home opener (a loss against the Phoenix Suns), chances for the team to remain in Seattle took a heavy blow, as Sonics' owner Clay Bennett made public his desire to relocate the team to Oklahoma City. The SuperSonics remained on a losing streak that reached 8 games, their worst start in franchise history, and remained the only team in the league without a win before defeating the Miami Heat, followed by a Durant game-winner two days later to get past the Atlanta Hawks. The SuperSonics finished the month of November snapping a 6-game losing streak with their first home victory in a game against the Indiana Pacers, with Durant scoring a career-high 35 points. Before the win against the Pacers, the Sonics where 0–7 at home.

The Sonics registered their best record of the season in December, struggling with injuries to Luke Ridnour, Delonte West and Kurt Thomas adding to the absence of center Robert Swift. Kevin Durant matched again his career-high 35 points in a win against the Milwaukee Bucks, one of their four victories at home that month. After a 2–3 road trip that ended with a loss against the Utah Jazz in which the Sonics were held to one of their lowest scoring outputs in the season, the team returned to the KeyArena to close the year with a 5-game homestand.

After a loss against the Philadelphia 76ers in the last game of 2007, the Sonics went on their longest losing streak of the season, dropping their first 13 games of January in a combined franchise worst 14-game losing streak. During the first games of the month, the team were without the services of their second best scorer Chris Wilcox and point guard Luke Ridnour, who were sidelined with injuries. The Sonics halted the streak by defeating the defending champions San Antonio Spurs and proceeded to win their next two games at home.

After managing to win only 2 of their 16 games in January, the SuperSonics finished February with a 4–8 record and snapped an 8-game losing streak of road games with a victory against the Sacramento Kings, obtaining their first road win since mid-December. Robert Swift returned from his injuries and played his first game since November 11 in a loss against the Chicago Bulls, but would be sidelined for the remainder of the season after two more appearances.
The SuperSonics reached the All-Star break with a 13–38 record, 10 games behind their worst record in franchise history at the time. Rookies Kevin Durant and Jeff Green participated in the T-Mobile Rookie Challenge against the second-year players.
Near the trade deadline, the Sonics sent Kurt Thomas to the San Antonio Spurs for Brent Barry, Francisco Elson and a 2009 second round draft pick. Barry was waived the next day. The Sonics made one more move before the deadline, that sent Wally Szczerbiak and Delonte West to the Cleveland Cavaliers in a three-team deal with the Chicago Bulls.

The Sonics finished the month of March with their worse record in the regular season, winning only two games, with losing streaks of 11 and 3 games. At this point the Sonics had a 17–57 record and were six games away from their franchise worst 23–59. On March 16, the Denver Nuggets dealt the Sonics their worst loss in franchise history, with a 116–168 score. It was the most points the Nuggets' scored since a January 11, 1984, game against the San Antonio Spurs. Nearing the end of the month, injuries plagued the roster. Mickaël Gelabale tore his ACL during a practice and was out for the remainder of the season. Chris Wilcox re-injured his pinky finger, an injury that ultimately made him miss the remainder of the season, and Nick Collison and Francisco Elson were also sidelined with other injuries.

In April, the Sonics stretched their March losing streak to five games before winning in a double overtime match against the Denver Nuggets. After losing another three straight games, the Sonics played their last home game in Seattle, defeating the Dallas Mavericks 99–95 and closing the regular season with a road victory against the Golden State Warriors. The SuperSonics finished the season with a 20–62 overall record, their worst in franchise history.

Standings

Record vs. opponents

Game log

|- bgcolor=#ffcccc
| 1
| October 31
| @ Denver
| 
| Damien Wilkins (21)
| Nick Collison (11)
| Earl Watson (7)
| Pepsi Center19,380
| 0–1

|- bgcolor=#ffcccc
| 2
| November 1
| Phoenix
| 
| Kevin Durant (27)
| Chris Wilcox (11)
| Earl Watson (8)
| KeyArena17,072
| 0–2
|- bgcolor=#ffcccc
| 3
| November 4
| @ L. A. Clippers
| 
| Kevin Durant (24)
| Nick Collison (10)
| Damien Wilkins (6)
| Staples Center17,376
| 0–3
|- bgcolor=#ffcccc
| 4
| November 6
| @ Sacramento
| 
| Wally Szczerbiak (32)
| Chris Wilcox (10)
| Earl Watson (8)
| ARCO Arena14,908
| 0–4
|- bgcolor=#ffcccc
| 5
| November 7
| Memphis
| 
| Chris Wilcox (21)
| Chris WilcoxNick Collison(8)
| Earl Watson (8)
| KeyArena10,761
| 0–5
|- bgcolor=#ffcccc
| 6
| November 9
| Utah
| 
| Kevin Durant (20)
| Nick Collison (12)
| Earl Watson (11)
| KeyArena15,980
| 0–6
|- bgcolor=#ffcccc
| 7
| November 11
| Detroit
| 
| Kevin Durant (19)
| Chris Wilcox (9)
| Luke Ridnour (7)
| KeyArena16,379
| 0–7
|- bgcolor=#ffcccc
| 8
| November 13
| @ Orlando
| 
| Nick Collison (15)
| Jeff Green (7)
| Delonte WestEarl Watson(4)
| Amway Arena16,101
| 0–8
|- bgcolor="#bbffbb"
| 9
| November 14
| @ Miami
| 
| Chris Wilcox (20)
| Nick Collison (11)
| Delonte WestEarl Watson(6)
| American Airlines Arena19,600
| 1–8
|- bgcolor="#bbffbb"
| 10
| November 16
| @ Atlanta
| 
| Damien Wilkins (41)
| Nick Collison (14)
| Earl Watson (9)
| Philips Arena13,534
| 2–8
|- bgcolor=#ffcccc
| 11
| November 17
| @ Charlotte
| 
| Chris Wilcox (24)
| Chris Wilcox (9)
| Earl Watson (5)
| Charlotte Bobcats Arena13,697
| 2–9
|- bgcolor=#ffcccc
| 12
| November 19
| @ Memphis
| 
| Delonte West (17)
| Jeff Green (14)
| Damien Wilkins (6)
| FedExForum10,863
| 2–10
|- bgcolor=#ffcccc
| 13
| November 23
| New Jersey
| 
| Delonte West (17)
| Jeff Green (14)
| Kurt ThomasEarl WatsonNick Collison(3)
| KeyArena14,424
| 2–11
|- bgcolor=#ffcccc
| 14
| November 25
| San Antonio
| 
| Wally Szczerbiak (27)
| Kurt Thomas (7)
| Delonte West (5)
| KeyArena14,186
| 2–12
|- bgcolor=#ffcccc
| 15
| November 27
| @ L. A. Lakers
| 
| Kevin Durant (25)
| Kurt Thomas (13)
| Earl Watson (6)
| Staples Center18,997
| 2–13
|- bgcolor=#ffcccc
| 16
| November 28
| Orlando
| 
| Kevin Durant (22)
| Kurt Thomas (14)
| Kevin DurantEarl Watson(4)
| KeyArena12,398
| 2–14
|- bgcolor="#bbffbb"
| 17
| November 30
| Indiana
| 
| Kevin Durant (35)
| Kurt Thomas (18)
| Earl Watson (11)
| KeyArena14,786
| 3–14

|- bgcolor=#ffcccc
| 18
| December 2
| Golden State
| 
| Chris WilcoxEarl Watson(16)
| Chris Wilcox (11)
| Earl Watson (5)
| KeyArena11,461
| 3–15
|- bgcolor="#bbffbb"
| 19
| December 5
| L. A. Clippers
| 
| Nick Collison (18)
| Nick Collison (17)
| Earl Watson (6)
| KeyArena10,961
| 4–15
|- bgcolor="#bbffbb"
| 20
| December 7
| Milwaukee
| 
| Kevin Durant (35)
| Chris Wilcox (13)
| Earl Watson (9)
| KeyArena13,142
| 5–15
|- bgcolor=#ffcccc
| 21
| December 9
| @ New Orleans
| 
| Kevin Durant (23)
| Nick CollisonChris Wilcox(12)
| Earl Watson (8)
| New Orleans Arena10,773
| 5–16
|- bgcolor=#ffcccc
| 22
| December 11
| @ Chicago
| 
| Kevin Durant (16)
| Jeff Green (6)
| Earl Watson (6)
| United Center21,772
| 5–17
|- bgcolor="#bbffbb"
| 23
| December 12
| @ New York
| 
| Kevin Durant (30)
| Kurt Thomas (8)
| Kevin DurantEarl Watson(4)
| Madison Square Garden17,637
| 6–17
|- bgcolor="#bbffbb"
| 24
| December 14
| @ Minnesota
| 
| Chris Wilcox (19)
| Chris Wilcox (11)
| Earl Watson (8)
| Target Center16,523
| 7–17
|- bgcolor=#ffcccc
| 25
| December 15
| @ Utah
| 
| Wally Szczerbiak (24)
| Nick Collison (9)
| Earl Watson (5)
| EnergySolutions Arena19,911
| 7–18
|- bgcolor=#ffcccc
| 26
| December 19
| New Orleans
| 
| Kevin Durant (18)
| Nick Collison (9)
| Kevin DurantJeff Green(5)
| KeyArena11,968
| 7–19
|- bgcolor="#bbffbb"
| 27
| December 21
| Toronto
| 
| Kevin Durant (27)
| Nick Collison (10)
| Earl Watson (7)
| KeyArena13,661
| 8–19
|- bgcolor=#ffcccc
| 28
| December 25
| @ Portland
| 
| Kevin Durant (23)
| Nick Collison (14)
| Earl Watson (11)
| Rose Garden20,527
| 8–20
|- bgcolor=#ffcccc
| 29
| December 27
| Boston
| 
| Kevin Durant (25)
| Kurt Thomas (14)
| Delonte West (8)
| KeyArena17,072
| 8–21
|- bgcolor="#bbffbb"
| 30
| December 29
| Minnesota
| 
| Jeff GreenWally Szczerbiak(18)
| Kurt Thomas (15)
| Delonte West (7)
| KeyArena14,038
| 9–21
|- bgcolor=#ffcccc
| 31
| December 31
| Philadelphia
| 
| Earl Watson (18)
| Kurt Thomas (13)
| Earl Watson (7)
| KeyArena10,595
| 9–22

|- bgcolor=#ffcccc
| 32
| January 3
| @ Phoenix
| 
| Kevin Durant (28)
| Nick Collison (15)
| Earl Watson (8)
| US Airways Center18,422
| 9–23
|- bgcolor=#ffcccc
| 33
| January 6
| @ Washington
| 
| Kevin Durant (19)
| Nick Collison (17)
| Kurt ThomasDelonte West(4)
| Verizon Center17,816
| 9–24
|- bgcolor=#ffcccc
| 34
| January 8
| @ Cleveland
| 
| Kevin Durant (24)
| Nick Collison (14)
| Earl Watson (6)
| Quicken Loans Arena20,409
| 9–25
|- bgcolor=#ffcccc
| 35
| January 9
| @ New Jersey
| 
| Johan Petro (22)
| Nick Collison (13)
| Delonte West (5)
| Izod Center14,101
| 9–26
|- bgcolor=#ffcccc
| 36
| January 11
| Dallas
| 
| Wally Szczerbiak (17)
| Kurt Thomas (15)
| Kevin Durant (6)
| KeyArena12,522
| 9–27
|- bgcolor=#ffcccc
| 37
| January 14
| L. A. Lakers
| 
| Nick Collison (24)
| Nick Collison (18)
| Luke Ridnour (11)
| KeyArena13,452
| 9–28
|- bgcolor=#ffcccc
| 38
| January 16
| @ New Orleans
| 
| Kevin Durant (20)
| Kevin DurantJohan Petro(7)
| Earl Watson (11)
| New Orleans Arena9,882
| 9–29
|- bgcolor=#ffcccc
| 39
| January 18
| @ Memphis
| 
| Kevin Durant (22)
| Kurt Thomas (8)
| Earl Watson (8)
| FedExForum13,451
| 9–30
|- bgcolor=#ffcccc
| 40
| January 19
| @ Dallas
| 
| Wally Szczerbiak (26)
| Nick Collison (12)
| Earl Watson (6)
| American Airlines Center20,386
| 9–31
|- bgcolor=#ffcccc
| 41
| January 21
| @ Houston
| 
| Jeff GreenWally Szczerbiak(15)
| Kurt Thomas (11)
| Earl Watson (9)
| Toyota Center15,264
| 9–32
|- bgcolor=#ffcccc
| 42
| January 23
| Houston
| 
| Kevin Durant (25)
| Nick Collison (14)
| Luke Ridnour (8)
| KeyArena12,342
| 9–33
|- bgcolor=#ffcccc
| 43
| January 25
| Atlanta
| 
| Chris Wilcox (18)
| Chris Wilcox (7)
| Luke Ridnour (4)
| KeyArena13,647
| 9–34
|- bgcolor=#ffcccc
| 44
| January 27
| Sacramento
| 
| Kevin Durant (19)
| Kurt Thomas (10)
| Earl Watson (8)
| KeyArena13,409
| 9–35
|- bgcolor="#bbffbb"
| 45
| January 29
| San Antonio
| 
| Kevin Durant (26)
| Nick CollisonChris Wilcox(10)
| Kevin DurantLuke Ridnour(5)
| KeyArena13,295
| 10–35
|- bgcolor="#bbffbb"
| 46
| January 31
| Cleveland
| 
| Kevin Durant (24)
| Chris Wilcox (13)
| Earl Watson (12)
| KeyArena13,109
| 11–35

|- bgcolor="#bbffbb"
| 47
| February 2
| New York
| 
| Kevin Durant (21)
| Nick Collison (12)
| Earl Watson (8)
| KeyArena12,783
| 12–35
|- bgcolor=#ffcccc
| 48
| February 4
| Chicago
| 
| Wally Szczerbiak (21)
| Nick Collison (9)
| Earl Watson (8)
| KeyArena10,935
| 12–36
|- bgcolor="#bbffbb"
| 49
| February 6
| @ Sacramento
| 
| Earl Watson (23)
| Earl WatsonChris Wilcox (10)
| Earl Watson (10)
| ARCO Arena13,136
| 13–36
|- bgcolor=#ffcccc
| 50
| February 8
| @ Phoenix
| 
| Chris Wilcox (22)
| Chris Wilcox (15)
| Earl Watson (5)
| US Airways Center18,422
| 13–37
|- bgcolor=#ffcccc
| 51
| February 13
| Utah
| 
| Kevin Durant (19)
| Kurt Thomas (13)
| Earl Watson (14)
| KeyArena10,618
| 13–38
|- bgcolor="#bbffbb"
| 52
| February 19
| Memphis
| 
| Earl Watson (26)
| Nick CollisonJeff Green (9)
| Earl Watson (9)
| KeyArena11,391
| 14–38
|- bgcolor=#ffcccc
| 53
| February 21
| @ Portland
| 
| Kevin Durant (20)
| Nick Collison (14)
| Earl Watson (9)
| Rose Garden20,168
| 14–39
|- bgcolor="#bbffbb"
| 54
| February 22
| Portland
| 
| Kevin Durant (17)
| Jeff Green (9)
| Earl Watson (4)
| KeyArena16,640
| 15–39
|- bgcolor=#ffcccc
| 55
| February 24
| L. A. Lakers
| 
| Mickaël Gelabale (21)
| Johan Petro (10)
| Earl Watson (8)
| KeyArena17,072
| 15–40
|- bgcolor=#ffcccc
| 56
| February 26
| @ Golden State
| 
| Kevin DurantJeff Green (21)
| Nick Collison (13)
| Luke Ridnour (15)
| Oracle Arena19,412
| 15–41
|- bgcolor=#ffcccc
| 57
| February 27
| Denver
| 
| Kevin DurantMickaël Gelabale (16)
| Johan Petro (8)
| Mickaël Gelabale (6)
| KeyArena13,627
| 15–42
|- bgcolor=#ffcccc
| 58
| February 29
| Miami
| 
| Chris Wilcox (30)
| Nick CollisonJeff Green (11)
| Luke Ridnour (5)
| KeyArena12,542
| 15–43

|- bgcolor="#bbffbb"
| 59
| March 2
| @ Minnesota
| 
| Kevin Durant (25)
| Chris Wilcox (15)
| Earl Watson (9)
| Target Center11,508
| 16–43
|- bgcolor=#ffcccc
| 60
| March 4
| @ Detroit
| 
| Earl Watson (23)
| Johan PetroChris Wilcox (10)
| Earl Watson (7)
| The Palace of Auburn Hills22,076
| 16–44
|- bgcolor=#ffcccc
| 61
| March 5
| @ Milwaukee
| 
| Kevin Durant (23)
| Johan Petro (15)
| Earl Watson (8)
| Bradley Center15,010
| 16–45
|- bgcolor=#ffcccc
| 62
| March 7
| @ Philadelphia
| 
| Chris Wilcox (20)
| Nick CollisonJohan Petro (5)
| Earl Watson (5)
| Wachovia Center17,762
| 16–46
|- bgcolor=#ffcccc
| 63
| March 9
| @ Toronto
| 
| Chris Wilcox (28)
| Chris Wilcox (10)
| Luke Ridnour (9)
| KeyArena19,800
| 16–47
|- bgcolor=#ffcccc
| 64
| March 11
| @ Indiana
| 
| Kevin Durant (27)
| Nick Collison (8)
| Luke Ridnour (8)
| Conseco Fieldhouse11,216
| 16–48
|- bgcolor=#ffcccc
| 65
| March 12
| @ Boston
| 
| Kevin Durant (16)
| Johan Petro (10)
| Earl Watson (7)
| TD Banknorth Garden18,624
| 16–49
|- bgcolor=#ffcccc
| 66
| March 14
| Minnesota
| 
| Kevin Durant (24)
| Nick Collison (8)
| Earl Watson (10)
| KeyArena14,035
| 16–50
|- bgcolor=#ffcccc
| 67
| March 16
| @ Denver
| 
| Kevin Durant (23)
| Chris Wilcox (12)
| Earl Watson (7)
| Pepsi Center19,155
| 16–51
|- bgcolor=#ffcccc
| 68
| March 19
| Phoenix
| 
| Jeff Green (19)
| Nick Collison (12)
| Four players (3)
| KeyArena17,072
| 16–52
|- bgcolor=#ffcccc
| 69
| March 21
| @ L. A. Lakers
| 
| Kevin DurantEarl Watson (20)
| Johan Petro (11)
| Earl Watson (7)
| Staples Center18,997
| 16–53
|- bgcolor=#ffcccc
| 70
| March 22
| @ Utah
| 
| Kevin DurantJeff Green (23)
| Nick Collison (13)
| Earl Watson (5)
| EnergySolutions Arena19,911
| 16–54
|- bgcolor="#bbffbb"
| 71
| March 24
| Portland
| 
| Kevin Durant (23)
| Nick Collison (11)
| Luke Ridnour (9)
| KeyArena11,292
| 17–54
|- bgcolor=#ffcccc
| 72
| March 26
| Washington
| 
| Kevin Durant (32)
| Nick Collison (21)
| Earl Watson (6)
| KeyArena10,497
| 17–55
|- bgcolor=#ffcccc
| 73
| March 28
| Charlotte
| 
| Kevin Durant (18)
| Nick Collison (10)
| Earl Watson (6)
| KeyArena13,592
| 17–56
|- bgcolor=#ffcccc
| 74
| March 30
| Sacramento
| 
| Kevin Durant (25)
| Nick Collison (8)
| Earl Watson (12)
| KeyArena10,862
| 17–57

|- bgcolor=#ffcccc
| 75
| April 2
| L. A. Clippers
| 
| Kevin Durant (30)
| Nick Collison (17)
| Luke Ridnour (6)
| KeyArena10,392
| 17–58
|- bgcolor=#ffcccc
| 76
| April 4
| Houston
| 
| Nick Collison (15)
| Johan Petro (15)
| Three players (4)
| KeyArena14,170
| 17–59
|- bgcolor="#bbffbb"
| 77
| April 6
| Denver
| 
| Kevin Durant (37)
| Nick Collison (14)
| Earl Watson (11)
| KeyArena13,104
| 18–59
|- bgcolor=#ffcccc
| 78
| April 8
| @ Dallas
| 
| Earl Watson (22)
| Jeff Green (8)
| Earl Watson (8)
| American Airlines Center20,228
| 18–60
|- bgcolor=#ffcccc
| 79
| April 9
| @ Houston
| 
| Kevin Durant (26)
| Nick Collison (15)
| Earl Watson (8)
| Toyota Center18,370
| 18–61
|- bgcolor=#ffcccc
| 80
| April 11
| @ San Antonio
| 
| Kevin Durant (20)
| Nick Collison (14)
| Luke Ridnour (4)
| AT&T Center18,797
| 18–62
|- bgcolor="#bbffbb"
| 81
| April 13
| Dallas
| 
| Earl Watson (21)
| Nick Collison (11)
| Earl Watson (10)
| KeyArena16,272
| 19–62
|- bgcolor="#bbffbb"
| 82
| April 16
| @ Golden State
| 
| Kevin Durant (42)
| Nick CollisonKevin Durant (13)
| Earl Watson (12)
| Oracle Arena19,596
| 20–62

Relocation to Oklahoma City

On September 21, 2007, majority owner Clay Bennett applied for arbitration by a federal judge on the issue of whether the team could break its lease on the KeyArena in 2008. Bennett initially set a deadline for October 31, 2007, for the City of Seattle to reach an agreement regarding a new facility, and two days past that date Bennett informed the NBA commissioner David Stern of his intentions to relocate the team to Oklahoma City. Seattle had filed a lawsuit on September 23, 2007, in an attempt to keep the Sonics from leaving before the end of their lease in 2010.

Microsoft CEO Steve Ballmer made a new offer on a KeyArena expansion on March. Ballmer proposed to pay half of the US$300 million required for the expansion and set an April 10, 2008, deadline for the City of Seattle to accept the offer. After the deal fell through, all hopes rested on the lawsuit set for June 2008.

On April 18, 2008, the NBA Board of Governors approved the team's relocation to Oklahoma City by a 28–2 vote. Mark Cuban, owner of the Dallas Mavericks and Paul Allen of the Portland Trail Blazers were the only ones against the move. On July 2, 2008, the City of Seattle and the Sonics' ownership reached a settlement that allowed the franchise to move to Oklahoma City. According to the settlement, items associated with the SuperSonics' history in Seattle, including trophies, banners, and retired jerseys, stayed in the city and were placed in the Museum of History and Industry.

Player stats

  Statistics with the Seattle SuperSonics.

Awards
 Kevin Durant won the Western Conference Rookie of the Month Award for every month with the exception of February. At the end of the season, Durant was named Rookie of the Year and was selected to the NBA All-Rookie First Team along Jeff Green.

Injuries
 Robert Swift missed the majority of the season after tearing his ACL the previous season. After playing in only 8 games, Swift underwent knee surgery on March to repair a torn lateral meniscus and was out for the remainder of the season.
 Mickaël Gelabale tore his ACL during a team practice on March and was sidelined for the rest of the season.

Transactions

Overview

  Sent during the regular season to the Cleveland Cavaliers as part of a 3-team trade that also involved the Chicago Bulls.
  Later waived.
  Thomas was later traded to the San Antonio Spurs.
  Signed for the rest of the season after a 10-day contract.

Trades

See also 
 2007–08 NBA season

Notes and references 

Seattle SuperSonics seasons
2007–08 NBA season by team